Atoka County is a county located in the U.S. state of Oklahoma. As of the 2010 census, the population was 14,007. Its county seat is Atoka. The county was formed before statehood from Choctaw Lands, and its name honors a Choctaw Chief named Atoka.

History

The area forming Atoka County was part of the Choctaw Nation after the tribe was forced to relocate in the early 1830s to Indian Territory from its home in the Southeastern United States. Unlike the State of Oklahoma, whose county boundaries follow the precise north–south, east–west grid established with the state's township and range system, the Choctaw Nation established its internal divisions using easily recognizable landmarks, such as mountains and rivers, as borders. The territory of present-day Atoka County fell within the Pushmataha District, one of the three administrative super-regions comprising the Choctaw Nation. Within that district, it was in parts of Atoka, Blue, and Jack's Fork counties.

The Choctaw named their Atoka County in honor of Chief Atoka, a leader of a party that migrated from Georgia to Indian Territory; the name was retained when Oklahoma became a state.

In 1858, the Butterfield Overland Mail established a stagecoach route through the area. It carried passengers, US Mail, and some freight. One station, Waddell's, was near Wesley; a second station, Geary's, was between Waddell's and the Muddy Boggy River, while a third was at Boggy Depot.

During the Civil War, Confederate troops established a supply depot named Camp Boggy Depot here. After the war, the town of Atoka was established. In 1872, the Missouri-Kansas-Texas Railway (nicknamed the Christopher Casey) built a track through the county. It bypassed Boggy Depot and passed through Atoka; this access increased the importance of Atoka, but lack of the railroad contributed to the decline of Boggy Depot.

The economy of Atoka County has been largely built on coal mining, limestone quarrying, forestry, and agriculture. Cattle raising became the leading business in the mid-twentieth century. A major employer is the Oklahoma State Penitentiary Farm (renamed the Mack H. Alford Correctional Center), a medium-security prison that opened in 1933.

Geography
Atoka County is in southeastern Oklahoma, in a 10-county area designated for tourism purposes by the Oklahoma Department of Tourism and Recreation as Choctaw Country.

Atoka County is drained by North Boggy, Clear Boggy and Muddy Boggy Creeks, which are tributaries of the Red River.  Atoka Reservoir is in the northern section of the county.  The Ouachita Mountains are in the eastern part of the county, while the Sandstone Hills and Coastal Plains physiographic regions provide a more level terrain suitable for agriculture in the north and western part of the county.

About 12 miles WSW of the town of Atoka is Boggy Depot State Park, the historic site of a once large community on the Butterfield Overland Mail stagecoach route.

The Katian Age of the Ordovician Period of geological time is named for Katy Lake, which is two miles north east of Atoka.
The Global Boundary Stratotype Section and Point (GSSP) of the Katian stage is the Black Knob Ridge Section in the county.

Major highways
  U.S. Highway 69
  U.S. Highway 75
  State Highway 3
  State Highway 7
 State Highway 43
 Indian Nation Turnpike

Adjacent counties
 Pittsburg County (north)
 Pushmataha County (east)
 Choctaw County (southeast)
 Bryan County (south)
 Johnston County (west)
 Coal County (northwest)

Demographics

As of the 2010 United States Census, there were 14,182 people, 4,964 households, and 3,504 families residing in the county.  The population density was 14 people per square mile (5.5/km2).  There were 5,673 housing units at an average density of 6 per square mile (2/km2).  73.8% of the population were White, 13.8% Native American, 3.7% Black or African American, 0.4% Asian, 1.1% of some other race and 7.1% of two or more races.  2.9% were Hispanic or Latino (of any race). 24.5% were of American, 11.7% Irish and 8.5% German ancestry. 97.4% spoke English and 1.4% Spanish as their first language.

There were 4,964 households, out of which 31.30% had children under the age of 18 living with them, 56.90% were married couples living together, 10.20% had a female householder with no husband present, and 29.40% were non-families. 27.10% of all households were made up of individuals, and 13.90% had someone living alone who was 65 years of age or older.  The average household size was 2.48 and the average family size was 3.01.

In the county, the population was spread out, with 23.60% under the age of 18, 8.20% from 18 to 24, 29.10% from 25 to 44, 24.30% from 45 to 64, and 14.80% who were 65 years of age or older.  The median age was 38 years. For every 100 females there were 117.80 males.  For every 100 females age 18 and over, there were 119.90 males.

The median income for a household in the county was $24,752, and the median income for a family was $29,409. Males had a median income of $26,193 versus $18,861 for females. The per capita income for the county was $12,919.  About 15.70% of families and 19.80% of the population were below the poverty line, including 25.40% of those under age 18 and 21.10% of those age 65 or over.

Politics

Government and infrastructure
The Oklahoma Department of Corrections operates the Mack Alford Correctional Center in an unincorporated area, near Stringtown.

Communities

City
 Atoka (county seat)

Towns
 Caney
 Stringtown
 Tushka

Census-designated places
 Wardville
 Lane

Other unincorporated places

 Bentley
 Bethany
 Blackjack
 Boehler
 Boggy Depot
 Bruno
 Burg
 Centerpoint
 Chockie
 Cook
 Crystal
 Daisy
 Dok
 East Allison
 East Talico
 Farris
 Flora
 Forrest Hill
 Fugate
 Goss
 Grassy Lake
 Half Bank Crossing
 Harmony
 Hickory Hill
 High Hill
 Hopewell
 Iron Stob
 Limestone Gap
 Lone Pine
 Mayers Chapel
 McGee Valley
 Mt. Carmel
 Mt. Olive
 Negro Bend
 New Hope
 Nix
 Old Farris
 Patapoe
 Payton Crossing
 Pine Springs
 Plainview
 Pleasant Hill
 Redden
 Reynolds
 Rock Springs
 Standing Rock
 Star
 Taloah
 Valley View
 Voca
 Wards Chapel
 Webster
 Wesley
 West Allison
 West Telico
 Wilson

NRHP sites

The following sites in Atoka County are listed on the National Register of Historic Places:

 Atoka Armory, Atoka
 Atoka Community Building, Atoka
 Isaac Billy Homestead and Family Cemetery, Daisy
 Boggy Depot Site, Atoka
 First Methodist Church Building, Atoka
 First Oil Well in Oklahoma, Wapanucka
 Indian Citizen Building, Atoka
 Captain Charles LeFlore House, Limestone Gap
 Masonic Temple, Atoka
 Bo McAlister Site, Wapanucka
 Middle Boggy Battlefield Site and Confederate Cemetery, Atoka
 Old Atoka County Courthouse, Atoka
 Old Atoka State Bank, Atoka
 Pioneer Club, Atoka
 Joe Ralls House, Atoka
 Captain James S. Standley House, Atoka
 Waddell's Station Site, Wesley
 Zweigel Hardware Store Building, Atoka

References

Further reading
 Underwood, William Henry.  "A History Atoka County, Oklahoma".  Bryan County Heritage Association, 1997.  213.

External links

 Encyclopedia of Oklahoma History and Culture - Atoka County
 Oklahoma Digital Maps: Digital Collections of Oklahoma and Indian Territory
 Atoka County Sheriff's Office

 
1907 establishments in Oklahoma
Populated places established in 1907